The Baoji South railway station is a railway station of Xi'an–Baoji high-speed railway and Baoji-Lanzhou high-speed railway that located in Baoji, Shaanxi, China.

Buildings and structures in Baoji
Railway stations in Shaanxi
Stations on the Xuzhou–Lanzhou High-Speed Railway
Railway stations in China opened in 2013